Delacroix is a French surname that derives from de la Croix ("of the Cross").

It may refer to:

People 

 Caroline Delacroix (1883–1945), French-Romanian mistress of Leopold II of Belgium
 Charles-François Delacroix (1741–1805), French ambassador to the Netherlands
 Eugène Delacroix (1798–1863), French artist, leader of the French Romantic school
 Gustave Delacroix de Ravignan (1795–1858), French Jesuit preacher and author
 Hiroyuki Sakai from Iron Chef, referred to as the Delacroix of French cuisine.
 Jean-François Delacroix (1753–1794), French revolutionary politician
 Léon Delacroix (1867–1929), Belgian statesman
 Michel Delacroix (painter) (born 1933), French painter
 Michel Delacroix (politician), Belgian politician
 Hélène Miard-Delacroix (born 1959), French historian, Germanist, professor

Fictional characters 

 Bruno Delacroix, character from the video game Call of Duty: Black Ops 4 Voyage of Despair
 Eduard Delacroix, character from the serial novel The Green Mile and its film adaptation
 Marie Delacroix, character from the video game System Shock 2
 Monique Delacroix Bond, mother of James Bond
 The Delacroix family, from The Lottery
 Victor Delacroix, character from the video game Chaos Legion
 Yvette Delacroix, character from the video game The Dagger of Amon Ra
 Yvonne-Marie Delacroix, from the novel series Masterminds by Gordon Korman
 Catherine Delacroix, character from the video game Orwell: Keeping an Eye on You
 Clarissa Delacroix, character from the book Mordew by Alex Pheby
 Genevieve Delacroix, character from the Netflix show  Bridgerton .

Other 

 Delacroix, Louisiana, USA
 Delacroix metro station, in Brussels, Belgium
 Musée national Eugène Delacroix, art museum in Paris, France
 10310 Delacroix, an asteroid

See also 

 Decroix
 de la Croix
 de la Cruz
 Delcroix
 Dellacroce

French-language surnames

ru:Делакруа